Road 81 is a road in central Iran. It starts from Sari, goes to Damghan and passes Dasht-e Kavir and Road 62 and Khur and ends at Yazd-Mashhad Road.

References

External links 

 Iran road map on Young Journalists Club

Roads in Iran